Hamissi Assani is a Mahoran politician. He served as the President of the General Council of Mayotte from March 1991 to April 1991 as an independent.

References 

Presidents of the General Council of Mayotte
Mayotte politicians
Living people
People from Mayotte
Year of birth missing (living people)